Carlos Coelho may refer to:
Carlos Coelho (footballer) (born 1953), Portuguese footballer who plays as a defender
Carlos Coelho (politician) (born 1960), Portuguese politician